Events during the year 2022 in Bhutan.

Incumbents

Events 

 14 January - Bhutan reports its first 14 cases of the SARS-CoV-2 Omicron variant in people who travelled abroad.
 23 September - Bhutan reopens, scrapping COVID-19 related restrictions.

References 

2022 in Asia
Bhutan
2020s in Bhutan
Years of the 21st century in Bhutan